Love, etc may refer to:

 Love, etc (novel), novel by Julian Barnes
 "Love Etc.", 2009 song by the Pet Shop Boys